Drosera rosulata is a perennial tuberous species in the genus Drosera that is endemic to southwest Western Australia. It grows in a rosette about 7 cm in diameter. It grows in sandy or clay soils on the margins of swamps. Its white flowers emerge in April to June. D. rosulata was first formally described by Johann Georg Christian Lehmann in 1844.

See also 
List of Drosera species

References 

Carnivorous plants of Australia
Caryophyllales of Australia
rosulata
Eudicots of Western Australia
Plants described in 1844